PSSM may refer to:
 Parallel-Split Shadow Map
 Position-Specific Scoring Matrix
 Pretty Soldier Sailor Moon, the official English translation of the series, often shortened as Sailor Moon
 Principles and Standards for School Mathematics, a policy book on mathematics education
 Polysaccharide storage myopathy, aka Equine polysaccharide storage myopathy (PSSM or EPSM), a disease in horses
 Positive sleep state misperception, subjective hypersomnia without objective findings.
 Rhizobium leguminosarum exopolysaccharide glucosyl ketal-pyruvate-transferase, an enzyme